Dyomino is a rural locality (a selo) Stepnoy Selsoviet, Soloneshensky District, Altai Krai, Russia. The population was 210 as of 2013. There are 3 streets.

Geography 
Dyomino is located 49 km southeast of Soloneshnoye (the district's administrative centre) by road.

References 

Rural localities in Soloneshensky District